Guillermo Fernández Hierro (born 23 May 1993), known simply as Guillermo, is a Spanish professional footballer who plays as a forward for Gimnàstic de Tarragona.

Club career
Born in Bilbao, Biscay and raised in nearby Arrigorriaga, Guillermo joined Athletic Bilbao's youth system in 2003. Seven years later he was promoted to the reserves, in Segunda División B – bypassing CD Basconia, the farm team and usual step in the progression of young players, due to his abilities in the youth sides.

After scoring six goals in only seven appearances for the B's in the beginning of the 2013–14 season, Guillermo was called up to the first team by coach Ernesto Valverde. On 21 October 2013, he was included in the squad for a 2–0 La Liga home win against Villarreal CF, but did not leave the bench. He finally made his debut in the competition on 9 November, starting and playing 68 minutes in a 2–1 victory over Levante UD also at San Mamés.

Guillermo scored his first goal for the Lions main squad on 23 February 2014, coming on for Iker Muniain in the 79th minute of an eventual 2–0 win at Real Betis and netting through a header after 60 seconds. His second came on 21 October in the group phase of the UEFA Champions League, in a 2–1 away loss to FC Porto. On 13 August 2015, he was loaned to CD Leganés in Segunda División in a season-long deal.

On 17 August 2016, Guillermo terminated his contract with Athletic and signed a two-year contract with Elche CF just hours later. The following 27 June, after suffering relegation, he agreed to a three-year deal with fellow second tier club CD Numancia.

On 10 January 2018, Guillermo scored twice to help to a 2–2 draw against Real Madrid at the Santiago Bernabéu Stadium for the Copa del Rey after having come as a first-half substitute, but the hosts had already won 3–0 in the first leg to progress to the quarter-finals. On the last day of the 2020 January transfer window, the free agent joined Racing de Santander until 30 June 2022.

Career statistics

Club

References

External links

1993 births
Living people
Spanish footballers
Footballers from Bilbao
Association football forwards
La Liga players
Segunda División players
Segunda División B players
Primera Federación players
Bilbao Athletic footballers
Athletic Bilbao footballers
CD Leganés players
Elche CF players
CD Numancia players
Racing de Santander players
Burgos CF footballers
Gimnàstic de Tarragona footballers